Ytalo José Oliveira dos Santos (born 12 January 1988), simply known as Ytalo, is a Brazilian professional footballer who plays for Ferroviária, on loan from Red Bull Bragantino as a forward.

Biography
Born in Maceió, Alagoas, Ytalo started his career at Corinthians Alagoano and played once in 2005 Copa do Brasil. On 1 February 2006 he left for Portuguese side Marítimo and played for its B team at Portuguese Second Division. He made his first team debut on 12 August 2007, substituted Bruno Fogaça at second half, losing to Penafiel in 2007–08 Taça da Liga after penalty shootout. That season he scored once in 2 league appearances. In 2008–09 Primeira Liga, he played 10 league appearances and scored once.

After played the first round of 2009–10 Primeira Liga, he was loaned to Internacional, but mainly played for its B team. In August 2010, his loan was extended for 2 more years. He won 2009 and 2010 Copa FGF with Internacional B. He also played 3 matches and scored once with Internacional at 2010 Campeonato Gaúcho, which Inter finished as runner-up. He went to Portugal for a second spell with Marítimo for the 2012–13 season, returning in March 2013 to sign for Corinthians Alagoano in the final stage of Campeonato Alagoano. In June he signed for Paulista, to compete in the 2013 Copa Paulista, but suffered a cruciate ligament injury, which kept him out until the following season.

Ytalo was signed by Audax in April 2014 and, as part of a partnership agreement, loaned out to Guaratinguetá for the 2014 Campeonato Brasileiro Série C season. He was top scorer in the division, and after returning to Audax for 2015 Campeonato Paulista he was loaned to Athletico Paranaense for the 2015 Campeonato Brasileiro Série A season. After impressing in a 2018 Campeonato Paulista match for Audax against them, Ytalo signed for São Paulo on 20 May 2016.

On 5 June 2016, Ytalo scored his first goal for São Paulo in the 1–0 Campeonato Brasileiro Série A victory against Cruzeiro. He suffered a cruciate ligament injury soon after, and was out for the rest of the season. After recovering from surgery he was loaned back to Audax. At the conclusion of the state league campaign he signed for CRB for their 2017 Campeonato Brasileiro Série B campaign, but in August he moved to Republic of Macedonia side FK Vardar. He returned to Brazil in January 2018, signing with Linense for the 2018 Campeonato Paulista season.

In June 2018 Ytalo signed for Red Bull Brasil initially for the 2018 Copa Paulista, but then extended for 2019 Campeonato Paulista. He became part of the Red Bull Bragantino team when Red Bull Brasil merged with Clube Atlético Bragantino in April 2019.

Honours
Red Bull Bragantino
Campeonato Brasileiro Série B: 2019

References

External links
 Portuguese Liga stats. at LPFP.pt 
 
 

1988 births
Living people
People from Maceió
Brazilian footballers
Association football forwards
Campeonato Brasileiro Série A players
Campeonato Brasileiro Série B players
Campeonato Brasileiro Série C players
Sport Club Corinthians Alagoano players
Sport Club Internacional players
Mogi Mirim Esporte Clube players
Paulista Futebol Clube players
Guaratinguetá Futebol players
Grêmio Osasco Audax Esporte Clube players
Club Athletico Paranaense players
São Paulo FC players
Clube de Regatas Brasil players
FK Vardar players
Clube Atlético Linense players
Red Bull Brasil players
Red Bull Bragantino players
Esporte Clube Bahia players
Primeira Liga players
C.S. Marítimo players
Brazilian expatriate footballers
Expatriate footballers in Portugal
Brazilian expatriate sportspeople in Portugal
Sportspeople from Alagoas